Electrecord is a Romanian record label which was founded in 1932. It was subsequently transformed into the national recording company following the socialist doctrine of centralization and was the only record label in Communist Romania.

History

Communist times
To avoid disc importing from Western Europe and the U.S., Electrecord was often demanded to release copies of some of the discs released abroad (just as recording companies in U.S.S.R. were doing themselves). Even today it is the subject of many anecdotes complaining about the bad quality of Romanian discs; a comparison between an import and a local copy would be the most eloquent proof.

Electrecord had to balance the government's demands with those of listeners and musicians. Despite the poor quality of recordings and the lack of information on disc covers, Electrecord released a number of collection discs of which the most successful were the Formaţii de muzică pop series (translated "pop music bands"), which became Formaţii rock – "rock bands" starting with number four.

Contemporary
Beginning in 1990, Electrecord lost market share as record companies formed. But some of the groups who recorded for the label continued. Most discs released by Electrecord after 1990 were either greatest hits albums extracted from older recordings or remastered versions of LPs.

In June 2017, Electrecord released the album Songbird by pop singer-songwriter NAVI. Electrecord went into insolvency in 2018. A new start with a new corporate concept followed in 2020.

The last released by Electrecord album was in December 2022 - the CD album Se schimb ceva by the Romanian pop-singer Beni Mihai.

Roster

See also
 List of record labels

References

External links
  

1932 establishments in Romania
Classical music record labels
Electronic music record labels
IFPI members
Jazz record labels
Pop record labels
Record labels established in 1932
Rock record labels
Romanian record labels
World music record labels
Socialist Republic of Romania
State-owned record labels